The farnesyltransferase inhibitors (FTIs) are a class of experimental cancer drugs that target protein farnesyltransferase with the downstream effect of preventing the proper functioning of the Ras (protein), which is commonly abnormally active in cancer.

Background
Studies have suggested that interference with certain post-translational modification processes seem to have quite a high selectivity for targeting cells displaying tumour phenotypes, although the reason for this is a matter of controversy.

After translation, Ras goes through four steps of modification: isoprenylation, proteolysis, methylation and palmitoylation. Isoprenylation involves the enzyme farnesyltransferase (FTase) transferring a farnesyl group from farnesyl pyrophosphate (FPP) to the pre-Ras protein. Also, a related enzyme geranylgeranyltransferase I (GGTase I) has the ability to transfer a geranylgeranyl group to K and N-Ras (the implications of this are discussed below). Farnesyl is necessary to attach Ras to the cell membrane. Without attachment to the cell membrane, Ras is not able to transfer signals from membrane receptors.

Development
After a program of high-throughput screening of a class of drugs targeting the first step, the farnesyltransferase inhibitors (FTIs) were developed. One FTI found in the screening was clavaric acid, a mushroom isolate. A number of molecules were found to have FTI activity. Some earlier compounds were found to have major side effects, and their development was discontinued. The others have entered clinical trials for different cancers. SCH66336 (Lonafarnib) was the first to do so, followed by R115777 (Zarnestra, Tipifarnib).

Unfortunately, the predicted "early potential [of FTIs] has not been realised". The anti-tumour properties of FTIs were attributed to their action on Ras processing; however this assumption has now been questioned. Of the three members (H, N and K) of the Ras family, K-Ras is the form found most often mutated in cancer. As noted above, as well as modification by FFTase an alternative route to creation of biologically active Ras is through GGTase modification. When FFTase is blocked by FFTase inhibitors this pathway comes into operation – both K and N-Ras are able to be activated through this mechanism. In recognition of this a joint administration of FTIs and GTIs was tried, however this resulted in high toxicity. It is in fact thought that the lack of FTI toxicity may be due to a failure to fully inhibit Ras: FTIs actually target normal cells but alternative pathway allow these cells to survive (Downward J, 2003).

Explaining success
It has been suggested that the preclinical successes showing that many N- or K-Ras transformed cell lines (and even tumor cell lines that do not harbor Ras mutations) are sensitive to FTase inhibitors due to inhibition of farnesylation of a number of other proteins. Therefore, it is hoped that FTIs, whilst not Ras specific, still have potential for cancer therapy.

Investigation for alternative uses

Alzheimer's disease

LNK-754 inhibits the activity of a protein called farnesyl-transferase (FT). This class of molecules are called FTIs (or farnesyl-transferase inhibitors). As with mTOR inhibitors, many companies developed them to treat cancers, where they were unsuccessful. The mechanism by which FTIs work is through inhibition of this enzyme, which adds a fatty acid molecule to proteins (such as the oncogene, or cancer-generating, ras). Many proteins can exist in a cell in various locations, and the addition of a farnesyl group targets proteins to the plasma membrane. When ras gets to the plasma membrane, it becomes activated, and leads to tumour formation if this process is not stopped. It was thought that by inhibiting FT, ras will not be activated, therefore preventing cancer growth. The problem was that ras can also be modified by other mechanisms, and thus FTIs were not sufficient to inhibit malignant growth induced by ras signaling.

Most FTIs also have side effects (since they also indirectly affect mTOR), and their development for HD would likely not be successful. However, the remarkable finding is that Link Medicine has developed an FTI which does NOT affect mTOR signaling. This is a novel and important molecule, and might have higher probability to be of use for long term chronic diseases such as HD.

However, as with any new approach, it is too early yet to see if it will be safe in longer trials, and effective in people. But there is much room for hope, as this represents a completely novel mechanism to evaluate in people. If autophagy mechanisms in humans are similar as those of mice, then there is much reason for optimism. Lets hope for continued success for Link Medicine, so that it will be safe and the lead molecule progresses to the stage of being tested in HD subjects.

Protozoan parasites
FTIs can also be used to inhibit farnesylation in parasites such as Trypanosoma brucei (African sleeping sickness) and Plasmodium falciparum (malaria). These parasites seem to be more vulnerable to inhibition of Farnesyltransferase than humans, even though the drugs tested selectively target human FTase. In some cases the reason for this may be the parasites lack Geranylgeranyltransferase I. This vulnerability may pave the way for the development of selective, low toxicity, FTI based anti-parasitic drugs 'piggybacking' on the development of FTIs for cancer research.

Use in progeria

Studies have been published indicating that farnesyltransferase inhibitors such as lonafarnib a synthetic tricyclic derivative of carboxamide with antineoplastic properties can reverse instability of nuclear structure due to the genetic mutation of the LMNA gene. The drug has been used to treat children suffering from Hutchinson–Gilford progeria syndrome.
Results of the first-ever clinical drug trial for children with progeria, demonstrated the efficacy of a farnesyltransferase inhibitor (FTI).

List of farnesyltransferase inhibitors

Products in development
Tipifarnib
Lonafarnib

References

Farnesyltransferase inhibitors